Aleutian may refer to:

 Aleut people, the indigenous people of the Aleutian Islands, the Pribilof Islands, the Shumagin Islands, and the far western part of the Alaska Peninsula in Alaska and of Kamchatka Krai, Russia
 Aleutian disease, a disease in minks and ferrets
 Aleutian Islands, a chain of islands in Alaska
 Aleut language, the language of the Aleut people
 Alaska Peninsula, also called the Aleutian Peninsula, leading from the Alaska state mainland to the Aleutian Islands
 Aleutian Range, a mountain range in Alaska
 Aleutian Trench (or Aleutian Trough), a deep in the North Pacific Ocean at the western end of the Aleutian Islands
 SS Aleutian, an American passenger ship

See also

 
 
 Aleut (disambiguation)